Wang De-lu (1772–1843) was a general during the Qing dynasty. He was born in what is now Taibao City, Chiayi County, Taiwan.

He enlisted as a soldier aged 15, and later led China's navy. He died of natural causes during the First Opium War.

Because of his success as a soldier, he was ennobled by the imperial court, which also donated money for a lavish funeral and a huge tomb—the largest extant in Taiwan.

References

1772 births
1843 deaths
Qing dynasty generals
People from Chiayi County